The South Wales Amateur League was a former football league in South Wales. The league consisted of two divisions, named Divisions One and Two. Division One was a feeder to the Welsh Football League Division Three, and sat at level 5 of the Welsh football pyramid.

History
The league began in the 1946–47 season as the South Wales Corinthian League acting to bridge the gap between local football leagues and the Welsh Football League.  Eleven clubs entered the inaugural championship with Dinas Corries claiming the first title.

The league was merged with South Wales Senior League in the 2015–16 season to form South Wales Alliance League.

Member Clubs in the final 2014-15 season

Division 1

Aber Valley YMCA
Baglan Dragons
Caerau Link  
Hirwaun Welfare/Mackworth 
Llangynwyd Rangers 
Llantwit Fardre 
Merthyr Saints
Pencoed Athletic  
Pontyclun  
STM Sports
Ton & Gelli
Trefelin
Treforest 
Trelewis Welfare

Division 2

Aberfan SDC 
AFC Bargoed 
Brynna 
Canton Liberal 
Cardiff Draconians
Cardiff Hibernian
Clwb Cymric 
Dynamo Aber 
Graig 
Kenfig Hill 
Llanharry 
Rhydyfelin 
Splott Albion

Divisional Champions

1940s

1950s

1960s

1970s

1980s

1990s

2000s

2010s

Divisional Champions - by number of titles

 Taff's Well – 6 titles
 British Steel (Port Talbot)/ Corus Steel – 4 titles
 Cwmbach Sports – 4 titles
 Guest Keen – 4 titles
 Llantwit Major – 4 titles
 AFC Cardiff – 3 titles
 Dinas Powys – 3 titles
 Hoover Sports – 3 titles
 Beatus United/ AFC Porth – 2 titles
 Bridgend Town – 2 tiles
 Caerau Rangers/ Caerau – 2 titles
 Kenfig Hill – 2 titles
 Llangeinor – 2 titles
 Llantwit Fardre – 2 titles
 Pontllanfraith – 2 titles
 Porth Welfare – 2 titles
 Ton & Gelli– 2 titles
 Bryntirion Athletic – 1 title
 Cambrian & Clydach Vale BGC – 1 title
 Cwmaman Institute – 1 title
 Dinas Corries – 1 title
 Ely Rangers – 1 title
 Fleur De Lys Welfare – 1 title
 Gwynfi United – 1 title
 Hirwaun Welfare – 1 title
 Lysaghts – 1 title
 Penarth Town – 1 title
 Penrhiwceiber Rangers reserves – 1 title
 Porthcawl Town – 1 title
 Pyrene – 1 title
 Rhoose – 1 title
 STM Sports – 1 title
 Teddington – 1 title
 Tonyrefail Welfare – 1 title
 Trefelin BGC – 1 title
 Troedyrhiw – 1 title
 Wattstown BC – 1 title
 Ynyshir United – 1 title

References

External links
 Official League website

5
Sports leagues established in 1946
1946 establishments in Wales
Sports leagues disestablished in 2015
Defunct football competitions in Wales
2015 disestablishments in Wales